Sandra Pareja (born 1966/1967) is an Ecuadorian actress, best known for her role in the Ecuavisa television series . She began her acting career at age 16 in the theater group , and has appeared at Teatro El Ángel with the group La Mueca. She has also appeared on TV series such as Súbete a mi taxi on RTS.

Early life
Sandra Pareja was born in Guayaquil in 1966 or 1967. She remained with the group for 15 years.

Career
She took courses in biochemistry and pharmaceutical chemistry before completing her 5-year studies of dramatic arts at the National University of Cuyo in Mendoza, Argentina. She began teaching acting in schools, colleges and universities, in addition to teaching physical expression for companies and institutions.

She made her television debut in 1987, in the Ecuavisa costumbrista series, . Her character, Maribel la Virola, is the neighbor who is madly in love with Felipe Vera, played by Oswaldo Segura. She reprised this role in 1995 on Mis adorables entenados con billete, a continuation of the previous series but for RTS. On the same channel, she appeared in the series Súbete a mi taxi and Rosendo Presidente, again playing Maribel in the latter. In the early 2000s, she was in Ecuavisa's comic series Visa para un sueño. She was also part of La escuelita sketches on the show business program .

The same year she appeared in the play Ovarios.

From 2010 to 2020, Pareja was part of the RTS morning magazine El club de la Mañana, where she played a reporter named Sarota, as well as the character Sarita "Doña Sari" Piedad, an outgoing elderly woman.

Personal life
Sandra Pareja is married to Jorge Ballesteros, with whom she has one daughter.

Filmography

TV series and telenovelas
  (1989-1991) ... Maribel "La Virola"
 Mis adorables entenados con billete (1995–1997) ... Maribel "La Virola"
 Súbete a mi taxi (1997–1999) ... Maribel "La Virola"
 Visa para un sueño (2001)
 Rosendo Presidente (2006) ... Maribel "La Virola"
  (2008) ... Yuli

TV programs
 El Show de Felipe (1999)
  (2004-2008)
 El club de la mañana (2010-2020) ... Sarita Piedad "Doña Sari"

References

1960s births
Ecuadorian stage actresses
Ecuadorian telenovela actresses
Living people
National University of Cuyo alumni
People from Guayaquil
21st-century Ecuadorian women